Slavko Beravs (b. 19 June 1946 - d. 1978) was a Slovenian ice hockey player. He competed in the men's tournaments at the 1968 Winter Olympics and the 1972 Winter Olympics.

References

External links

1946 births
1978 deaths
Ice hockey players at the 1968 Winter Olympics
Ice hockey players at the 1972 Winter Olympics
Olympic ice hockey players of Yugoslavia
Slovenian ice hockey forwards
Sportspeople from Jesenice, Jesenice
HK Acroni Jesenice players
Yugoslav ice hockey forwards